"Autumn Almanac" is a song written by Ray Davies and recorded by the rock group the Kinks in 1967. "Autumn Almanac" has since been noted for being an "absolute classic", "a finely observed slice of English custom", and a "weird character study", and praised for its "mellow, melodic sound that was to characterize the Kinks' next [musical] phase..." Some have placed this and other Davies compositions in the pastoral-Romantic tradition of the poetry of Wordsworth, among others.

In his 1995 autobiography X-Ray and in subsequent performances of his VH1 Storytellers effort, Davies described the song as being inspired by a local hunch-backed gardener in his native Muswell Hill neighbourhood of North London.

"Autumn Almanac" was a non-album single in between 1967's Something Else by the Kinks and 1968's The Kinks Are the Village Green Preservation Society. The song was a big success in the UK, reaching #3 on the singles chart, but not in the US, where it failed to chart on the Billboard Hot 100. Like many recordings of the mid-to-late 1960s, "Autumn Almanac" was released in both mono and stereo versions.  The mono version was released as single and appears as a bonus track on the 1998 CD reissue of Something Else by The Kinks as well as most compilations.  The stereo version, which is ten seconds longer and features more psychedelic audio effects such as a tape loop during the fadeout, appears on the 1972 compilation The Kink Kronikles as well as the deluxe 2-CD reissue of Something Else.

Dave Davies spoke highly of "Autumn Almanac" in an interview with Yahoo!, saying, "I was playing through 'Autumn Almanac' [recently] and it’s a phenomenal recording. You can understand why it has lasted so long."

Personnel
According to band researcher Doug Hinman:

The Kinks
Ray Davies lead vocal, acoustic guitar
Dave Davies backing vocal, electric guitar
Pete Quaife backing vocal, bass
Mick Avory drums

Additional musicians
Rasa Davies backing vocals
Nicky Hopkins piano, Mellotron

Notes

References

Sources 

 
 

The Kinks songs
1967 singles
Songs written by Ray Davies
Song recordings produced by Ray Davies
Pye Records singles
1967 songs
Reprise Records singles
Baroque pop songs